is a train station in Kita-ku, Osaka, Japan on the Osaka Metro Midōsuji Line. While situated relatively close to the station of the same name operated by Hankyu Railway, there is no free transfer between the two stations.

Layout
This station has an island platform serving two tracks on the second basement and a Y returning track in the north of the platform.

References

Railway stations in Japan opened in 1964
Osaka Metro stations
Railway stations in Osaka Prefecture